Departamento compartido is a 1980 Argentine odd couple-styled comedy film.

Plot
Alberto is a jeweler whose wife, Silvina, has kicked him out of his house because of his slovenly lifestyle. Having no other place to go, the newly divorced Albert asks his friend Mauricio if he can stay at his home. Mauricio is the owner of an imported car dealership and lives a very neat, routine, and quiet lifestyle—the opposite of Alberto. The entry of Alberto into Mauricio's life and their radically clashing personalities results in both awkward and hilarious situations.

Cast
 Alberto Olmedo
 Tato Bores
 Graciela Alfano
 Camila Perissé
 César Bertrand
 Ovidio Fuentes
 Noemí Alan
 Marcos Zucker
 Menchu Quesada
 Arturo Bonín
 Jorge Porcel

External links 
 

1980 films
Argentine comedy films
Films directed by Hugo Sofovich
1980s Spanish-language films
Films shot in Buenos Aires
Films set in Buenos Aires
1980s Argentine films